The Southeastern Louisiana Lions basketball team is the men's basketball team that represents Southeastern Louisiana University in Hammond, Louisiana.  The school's team currently competes in the Southland Conference.

Postseason

NCAA Division I Tournament results
The Lions have appeared in the NCAA Division I tournament one time. Their record is 0–1.

National Invitation Tournament
The Lions have appeared in the National Invitation Tournament one time. Their record is 0–1

The Basketball Classic results
The Lions have appeared in The Basketball Classic one time. Their record is 0–1.

NCAA Division II Tournament results
The Lions have appeared in the NCAA tournament one time. Their record is 1–1.

NAIA Tournament
The Lions have appeared in the NAIA tournament three times. Their combined record is 2–3.

See also
List of NCAA Division I men's basketball programs

References

External links
Team website

 
1947 establishments in Louisiana
Basketball teams established in 1947